Shenyang (115) is the lead ship of Type 051C destroyer of the People's Liberation Army Navy. She was commissioned on 1 January 2006.

Development and design 

The Type 051C destroyers were constructed at Dalian Shipyard and was revealed in 2004. They use the advanced Russian S-300FM air defence missile system with track-via-missile homing guided by a single Tombstone radar. The missile has a maximum range of 150 km and an operating altitude of 10 m - 27 km.

The anti-ship abilities possessed by the Luzhou class includes 8 indigenous YJ-83 (C-803) Anti-ship missiles. This anti-ship missile has a range of 150+ km and approaches its target in sea skimming mode at a speed of  Mach 1.5.  As a secondary role, the missile can also be used against land targets.

The ship uses two Type 730 CIWS guns for air defence. The Type 730 is a highly effective CIWS that is also installed on the Type 052B (Guangzhou class) and Type 052C/052D destroyers, and the Type 054A (Jiangkai II class) frigates. The ship also has 100 mm gun based on a French design for use against surface targets.

Construction and career 
Shenyang was launched on 28 December 2004 at the Dalian Shipyard in Dalian. The system installation was completed in late 2005 and commissioned on 1 January 2006.

On April 23, 2009, to celebrate the 60th anniversary of the founding of the Chinese People's Liberation Army Navy, Shenyang served in the naval parade.

On July 5, 2013, 4 destroyers, 2 frigates, and 1 supply ship including the Shenyang (formation command ship) and Shijiazhuang arrived in Vladivostok, Russia for the Naval Cooperation 2013 Russian maritime joint military exercises.

Gallery

References 

2004 ships
Ships built in China
Type 051C destroyers